Christopher Drummond Hay (born 28 August 1974) is a Scottish former professional footballer. He played as a striker for Celtic, Swindon Town, Huddersfield Town, St Johnstone and Stirling Albion.

Hay began his professional career at Celtic in 1993, but only managed to make 26 league appearances in four years. He joined English club Swindon Town in 1997, and in just under a century of league appearances he scored 32 goals. In 2000, Hay moved to Huddersfield Town and spent two less successful seasons at the McAlpine Stadium.

Hay returned to Scotland in 2002 with Billy Stark's St Johnstone. He was Saints' top scorer in his first season, notching nine league goals. He went on to make 70 league appearances for the Perth club before joining Stirling Albion in 2005. He scored a hat-trick against Forfar Athletic on 3 December 2005.

External links

Notes

1974 births
Living people
Footballers from Glasgow
Scottish footballers
Scottish Football League players
English Football League players
Celtic F.C. players
Swindon Town F.C. players
Huddersfield Town A.F.C. players
St Johnstone F.C. players
Stirling Albion F.C. players
Association football forwards